Meyerius is a genus of mites in the Phytoseiidae family.

Species
 Meyerius agrostidis (van der Merwe, 1968)
 Meyerius chaetopus (van der Merwe, 1968)
 Meyerius citimus (van der Merwe, 1968)
 Meyerius collativus (van der Merwe, 1968)
 Meyerius convallis (van der Merwe, 1968)
 Meyerius egregius (van der Merwe, 1968)
 Meyerius fistella (Ueckermann & Loots, 1984)
 Meyerius heindrichi (Ueckermann & Loots, 1984)
 Meyerius immutatus (van der Merwe, 1968)
 Meyerius incisus (van der Merwe, 1968)
 Meyerius keetchi (Ueckermann & Loots, 1984)
 Meyerius latus (van der Merwe, 1968)
 Meyerius liliaceus (van der Merwe, 1968)
 Meyerius litus (Ueckermann & Loots, 1984)
 Meyerius maritimus (van der Merwe, 1968)
 Meyerius veretillum (van der Merwe, 1968)
 Meyerius zantedeschiae (van der Merwe, 1968)

References

Phytoseiidae